Edens Zero is a Japanese shōnen manga series written and illustrated by Hiro Mashima. It began serialization in Kodansha's Weekly Shōnen Magazine on June 26, 2018. The story follows a boy named Shiki Granbell who embarks on a voyage aboard the titular starship across different planets in search of a cosmic goddess known as "Mother". The chapters have been collected in tankōbon volumes since September 2018, with 25 volumes being released as of February 2023. The manga has also inspired a television anime and video game adaptation.

The series is published simultaneously in six different languages: English, French, Chinese, Korean, Thai, and Brazilian Portuguese. North American publisher Kodansha USA has released chapters of the series on digital platforms such as Crunchyroll Manga, ComiXology, and Amazon Kindle. The first English tankōbon was released in November 2018.



Volume list

Chapters not yet in tankōbon format
These chapters have yet to be published in a tankōbon volume. They were originally serialized in Japanese in issues of Weekly Shōnen Magazine from January to March 2023.

Notes

References

Lists of manga volumes and chapters